Cosmosoma aurifera is a moth of the family Erebidae. It was described by Edward A. Klages in 1906. It is found in Venezuela.

References

aurifera
Moths described in 1906